Nicholas Albert "Nick" D'Agostino (born August 15, 1989) is an American motivational speaker, author, coach, radio host, nonprofit founder, and entrepreneur.

Early life and education 
D'Agostino was born in Wantage Township, New Jersey. Along with his identical twin brother, Anthony, he was diagnosed with spinal muscular atrophy at 18 months old and started using an electric wheelchair at the age of six. He received a full posterior stainless steel rod around his spine at the age of eight. He graduated from High Point Regional High School in 2007 and earned an associate degree in English from Sussex County Community College and studied psychology at Thomas Edison State University for two years.

Career 
He performed orations at hundreds of shows, benefits, and open mics events, including his poem "My Heroine" at the March Against Heroin and the MDA Show of Strength, where he performed his poem "Gravity," to raise nearly one million dollars for the Muscular Dystrophy Association.

In 2012, D'Agostino, alongside his brother Anthony, launched his own online radio show called ANTagoNICKs, which had 71 episodes, and numerous shows with over 1,000 listeners.

In the same year, he founded The Safe Heaven, a nonprofit organization which focuses on "helping people realize their potential and self-worth." Through an online forum, their social media sites, and local events, The Safe Heaven has interacted with thousands of individuals.

In 2021, D'Agostino announced his intent to run against incumbent Democratic Representative Josh Gottheimer in 2022, filing as a Republican. However, in early 2022, D'Agostino announced that he would be dropping out of that race to instead run for Sussex County commissioner.

References

External links
 Official website

1989 births
Living people
People from Wantage Township, New Jersey
American motivational speakers
American spoken word artists
Writers from New Jersey
Identical twins
American twins
People with spinal muscular atrophy